The Dunedin Writers' Walk is a series of 25 commemorative plaques in the upper Octagon area of the city of Dunedin, New Zealand.

The plaques were installed to honour and celebrate the lives and works of writers with a Dunedin connection, many of whom were Robert Burns Fellows at the University of Otago. Each plaque includes a quote from the writer's work and brief biographical details.

The walk was the idea of local writer Lynley Hood, and was installed in 1993, with an initial eleven plaques. Only writers who had mentioned Dunedin in their work were considered in the initial list. There is a time capsule buried underneath the plaque for Jean de Hamel.

A plaque to Dan Davin was added in during the 2015 Dunedin Writers and Readers Festival. The twenty-fourth plaque, for playwright Robert Lord, was unveiled during the 2017 festival. During the 2021 festival, a plaque was added for romance writer Essie Summers. In February 2022, two plaques were added for poet Peter Olds and short story writer O.E. Middleton.

Janet Frame has two plaques in the Writers' Walk, one in the Octagon and a second at the "unofficial extension" of the walk at the railway station.

List

References 

The Octagon, Dunedin
New Zealand writers